Seed cycling is the rotation of different edible seeds into the diet at different times in the menstrual cycle.  Practitioners believe that since some seeds promote estrogen production, and others promote progesterone production, that eating these seeds in the correct parts of the menstrual cycle will balance the hormonal rhythm. 

There is no scientific evidence to support the belief that cycling the seeds actually regulates the hormonal rhythm, but the practice is probably harmless.

Overview
Seed cycling advocates note that the menstrual cycle is broken up into four interconnected phases. The first phase is menstruation, followed by the follicular phase, then ovulation, then the luteal phase.

Assuming a 28-day cycle, the first 13 days represent the menstrual and follicular phases, in which day 1 is when menstruation begins. During day-13, the seed cycling diet suggests consuming either flax or pumpkin seeds daily to boost estrogen, which helps support these phases and the move towards ovulation. 

Days 14-28 represent the ovulatory phase and luteal phase, with ovulation around day 14. The seed cycling diet suggests sesame or sunflower seeds to boost progesterone at this time, ground up to increase the surface area for absorption of the essential fatty acids, minerals, and other nutrients.

The seed cycling diet relies on the belief that most women have a 28-day cycle. However, only 10-15% of women have 28-30 day cycles; most women's cycles vary, or run longer or shorter. For women with irregular or absent cycle, menopause, or post-menopause, the seed cycling diet suggests starting the seed cycle with any two weeks, and then rotating. However, many women who track their cycles through symptothermal methods (e.g. Basal Body Temperature and cervical mucus) are able to adapt the seed cycling protocol to their individual cycle and therefore do not need to rely on the belief that women have 28-day cycles.

Research 
There is currently a lack of solid scientific evidence that supports seed rotating between the phases of the menstrual cycle or the Moon directly impacts hormonal disorders. The proposed benefits are mostly due to anecdotal reports.

Seed cycling claims are indirect effects on the women's hormonal cycles, PMS and, menopausal symptoms. However, there is research showing the direct benefits of the nutritional components present in the individual seeds, flax, pumpkin, sesame and sunflower seeds, in promoting hormonal balance. For example, flax seeds seem to be the most researched and beneficial. In a study, women taking one tablespoon of flax seed meal daily were able to lengthen their luteal phase, which resulted in fewer months without any ovulation. Flax seed has an effect on the luteal phase progesterone-estradiol ratio.

Another theory for rotating the seeds, rather than consuming all four at once, is the different mineral content that might support the follicular or luteal phases. For example, during the follicular phase, there is an increase in calcium, whereas there is an increase in magnesium during the luteal phase.

Reception

Seed cycling has been greeted sceptically by the press, with headlines like "Can 'seed cycling' really help to balance your hormones?" (The Telegraph) and "Can Eating Seeds Balance Your Hormones?" (New York magazine's The Cut blog). It has been called an obsession by Good Housekeeping. The Cut quotes dietitian Abby Langer as stating that food is not medicine, but that seed cycling might be "a worthwhile component of a treatment plan" for a hormonal imbalance, warning that seed cycling recipes using primrose oil could interact dangerously with anticoagulants and anaesthetics. 
Shape magazine notes that the seeds could possibly help regulate hormones, given their phytoestrogen content, but quotes Melinda Ring of the Osher Center for Integrative Medicine at Northwestern University in Chicago as stating that evidence is lacking, that the outcomes are unpredictable, and that she has seen women whose cycles became "more irregular" after taking phytoestrogens.

See also 

 Polycystic ovary syndrome – a common cause of irregular menstrual cycles

References 

Alternative medicine
Pseudoscience
Fad diets